Lara Filocamo (born 15 September 1990) is an Australian rules footballer who played for the Fremantle Football Club in the AFL Women's competition. Filocamo was drafted by Fremantle with their fourth selection and twenty-ninth overall in the 2016 AFL Women's draft. She played every match in her debut season to finish with seven matches. She was delisted by Fremantle at the end of the 2018 season.

References

External links 

1990 births
Living people
Fremantle Football Club (AFLW) players
Australian rules footballers from Western Australia